The Olympic Museum in Lausanne, Switzerland houses permanent and temporary exhibits relating to sport and the Olympic movement. With more than 10,000 artifacts, the museum is the largest archive of Olympic Games in the world and one of Lausanne's prime tourist site draws attracting more than 250,000 visitors each year.

The Olympic Museum and the Olympic Park (sculpture garden between the museum and Lake Léman) are located at Ouchy, south of Lausanne. The headquarters of the International Olympic Committee (IOC) are located at Vidy, to the west of Ouchy.

History 
The museum was founded on 23 June 1993, on the initiative of then-president of the IOC Juan Antonio Samaranch. Mexican architect Pedro Ramírez Vázquez, an International Olympic Committee member, and Jean-Pierre Cahen, were in charge of the project. The museum was named the European Museum of the Year in 1995.

After 23 months of renovation between 2012 and 2013, the Olympic Museum re-opened on 21 December 2013. During the transformations of the building, a temporary exhibition was set up in a boat (Helvétie) of the CGN, in front of the Olympic Park.

Exhibits

The permanent exhibition is organized into three major themes on three separate floors: Olympic World, Olympic Games, and Olympic Spirit. A visit begins on the third floor, where the Olympic World part of the exhibition informs visitors of the history of the ancient Olympic Games and the rebirth of the modern Games in the 19th century. Highlights include a display of Olympic torches, as well as a video documenting major moments in the history of opening ceremonies history.

The second floor focuses on Olympic Games. Sporting equipment for a variety of sports are on display, and visitors are introduced to the Youth Olympic Games and the Paralympic Games. More than 1,000 video clips of Olympic Games events and athletes can be searched and viewed at individual viewing stations.

The final part of the permanent exhibit covers the Olympic Spirit, where visitors are made to feel part of an Olympic Village and can test their balance, agility, and mental skills with interactive exercises. Olympic medals are also on display.

The renovated museum also includes a temporary exhibit space, where the museum regularly hosts traveling exhibits.

Olympic Park 
The Olympic Museum is surrounded by a park containing numerous works of art on the theme of sports. Among the most notable works of art in the museum's permanent collection are the French sculptors Auguste Rodin's The American Athlete and Niki de Saint Phalle's Les Footballeurs, the Luxembourgish sculptor Lucien Wercollier's tribute to the pole vault titled Altius, the Colombian sculptor Fernando Botero's Jeune Fille a la Balle, and a kinetic art sculpture by the Swiss sculptor Jean Tinguely which combines a hockey stick, a boar's head, and a motorbike wheel.

Gallery

See also
International Olympic Committee (IOC)

Notes and references

External links 
 
 Page on the website of the City of Lausanne
Olympic Museum within Google Arts & Culture

Olympic museums
Museums in Lausanne
Sport in Lausanne
International Sports Heritage Association
Museums established in 1993
1993 establishments in Switzerland